This is a list of diplomatic missions in Los Angeles. Many foreign governments have established diplomatic and trade representation in the city of Los Angeles, California. Most of them are at the Consulate-General level; many of these are located along Wilshire Boulevard or on the Westside of Los Angeles. In addition, Los Angeles has a number of honorary consulates. This list is associated with the Los Angeles Consular Corps.

Consulates General in Los Angeles 
The Los Angeles County Office of Protocol lists the following Consulates General:

The Netherlands and Sweden used to have consulates in Los Angeles, but they were closed in 2009.  Barbados also once had a consulate, but it has been inactive since 2005.

Beverly Hills

Glendale, California
The Armenian Consulate is located in Glendale due to that city's significant Armenian population.

Santa Monica
New Zealand and Uruguay's consulates operate out of Santa Monica.

Representative office

Honorary Consulates
Los Angeles has a number of honorary consulates.  Many of them are from smaller African, European, or Pacific countries that do not have full consulates.

 (Office in Beverly Hills)
 (Office in Beverly Hills)
 (Office in Camarillo)

 (Office in Torrance)

 (Honorary Consul Grant Arthur Gochin)

Consulates in San Francisco with jurisdiction in Los Angeles

References

External links
 
 

Diplomatic missions